The 200th Military Police Command is the senior law enforcement unit within the U.S. Army Reserve. The subordinate elements of the 200th MP Command are primarily military police units, but the command also includes criminal investigation detachments, chaplains, historians, and public affairs detachments. Units are dispersed across the continental United States with major subordinate units located in California, Michigan, New York, Tennessee, and Indiana. The formation of this command is a departure from the legacy structure of a strategic force in the Army Reserve with assigned chains of command based mostly on geography. The purpose of this command is to train, command, and deploy units primarily by their functional capabilities.

History
The 200th Military Police Command was constituted March 6, 2006 (from the former 220th MP Brigade) in the United States Army Reserve as the Headquarters and Headquarters Company, 200th Military Police Command. It was activated April 16, 2008 at Fort Meade, Maryland.

The 200th was formed as part of a transformation of the Army Reserve that reorganized units into strategically consolidated forces with similar functional capabilities. Nearly 97% of all Army Reserve military police assets are now commanded by the 200th.

Subordinate units 

As of 2017, the following units are subordinate to the 200th Military Police Command:

  11th Military Police Brigade, in Los Alamitos, California
 96th Military Police Battalion (I/R) (EPW/CI) San Diego, California
 324th Military Police Battalion (I/R) (EPW/CI), in Fresno, California
 387th Military Police Battalion (CS), in Glendale, Arizona
 390th Military Police Battalion (CS), in Joint Base Lewis-McChord, Washington
 393d Military Police Battalion (CID), in Bell, California
 607th Military Police Battalion (CS), in Grand Prairie, Texas
  290th Military Police Brigade, in Nashville, Tennessee
 160th Military Police Battalion (I/R) (EPW/CI), in Tallahassee, Florida
 304th Military Police Battalion (I/R) (EPW/CI), in Nashville, Tennessee
 317th Military Police Battalion (CS), in Tampa, Florida
 535th Military Police Battalion (I/R) (EPW/CI), in Cary, North Carolina
 724th Military Police Battalion (I/R) (EPW/CI), in Fort Lauderdale, Florida
 733d Military Police Battalion (CID), in Fort Gillem, Georgia
 307th Military Police Detachment (CID), in Jacksonville, Florida 
 383d Military Police Detachment (CID), in Lakeland, Florida   
  300th Military Police Brigade, in Inkster, Michigan
 159th Military Police Battalion (CID), in Terre Haute, Indiana
 378th Military Police Detachment (CID), in Louisville, Kentucky 
 327th Military Police Battalion (I/R) (EPW/CI), in Arlington Heights, Illinois
 384th Military Police Battalion (I/R) (EPW/CI), in Fort Wayne, Indiana
 391st Military Police Battalion (I/R) (EPW/CI), in Columbus, Ohio
 530th Military Police Battalion (I/R) (EPW/CI), in Elkhorn, Nebraska
 785th Military Police Battalion (I/R) (EPW/CI), in Fraser, Michigan
  333rd Military Police Brigade, in Farmingdale, New York
 306th Military Police Battalion, in Uniondale, New York
 310th Military Police Battalion (I/R) (EPW/CI), in Farmingdale, New York
 336th Military Police Battalion (CS), in Pittsburgh, Pennsylvania
 340th Military Police Battalion (I/R) (EPW/CI), in Ashley, Pennsylvania
 400th Military Police Battalion (I/R) (EPW/CI), in Fort Meade, Maryland
 744th Military Police Battalion (I/R) (EPW/CI), in Forks Township, Northampton County, Pennsylvania

I/R: Internment/Resettlement, EPW/CI: Enemy Prisoner of War/Civilian Internee, CID: Criminal Investigation Division, CS: Combat Support

See also
 The Phoenix Massacre

References

External links

 

Military units and formations of the United States Army Reserve
Military police commands of the United States Army
Military units and formations established in 2008